Saint Vincent and the Grenadines competed at the 2010 Summer Youth Olympics, the inaugural Youth Olympic Games, held in Singapore from 14 August to 26 August 2010.

Athletics

Note: The athletes who do not have a "Q" next to their Qualification Rank advance to a non-medal ranking final.

Boys
Track and Road Events

Girls
Track and Road Events

Taekwondo

References

External links
Competitors List: Saint Vincent and the Grenadines – Singapore 2010 official site

2010 in Saint Vincent and the Grenadines
Nations at the 2010 Summer Youth Olympics
Saint Vincent and the Grenadines at the Youth Olympics